DYAQ-TV (channel 30) is a television station in Murcia, Negros Occidental, Philippines, airing programming from the GMA network. Owned and operated by the network's namesake corporate parent, the station maintains studios from TV-13 at the 3/F iSecure Bldg. Rizal Cor. Locsin St., Bacolod, while its transmitter is located atop Mt. Canlandog, Murcia, Negros Occidental.

Digital television

Digital channels
UHF Channel 15 (479.143 MHz)

Areas of coverage

Primary Areas
 Negros Occidental
 Bacolod

Secondary Areas
 Guimaras
 Iloilo
Portion of Negros Oriental

Currently airing programs
GMA Regional TV Early Edition (2020)
One Western Visayas (2018)
Word of God Network (2016)

Previously aired programs
Isyu Subong Negrense - GMA Bacolod's flagship afternoon news & public affairs program 
Arangkada*

Program marked by (*) is simulcast from GMA Iloilo

See also
DYGM-TV
List of GMA Network stations

GMA Network stations
Television stations in Bacolod
Television channels and stations established in 2012